The Act 39 & 40 Geo 3 c 87, sometimes called the Thames Police Act 1800, the Thames River Police Act 1800, the Marine Police Act or the Depredations on the Thames Act 1800, was an Act of the Parliament of Great Britain, granted royal assent on 28 July 1800. As alluded to in its long title, it amended the Thefts upon the Thames Act 1762.

Established two years earlier, the Marine Police Force was initially run and funded by the West Indies merchants whose cargoes in the Pool of London it was principally intended to protect. The Act converted it to a publicly-run and publicly-funded body, increased its establishment to 88 men and set out regulations for how they were now to operate under the Home Secretary's direct supervision, thus laying the groundwork for the Force's absorption into the Metropolitan Police in 1839. 

The Act was amended and renewed by the Depredations on the Thames Act 1807 (47 Geo. 3 Sess. 1 c 37), the Depredations on the Thames Act 1814 (54 Geo. 3 c 187), the Police Magistrates Metropolitan Act 1822 (1 Geo. 4 c 66), the Police Magistrates, Metropolis Act 1833 (1833 (3 & 4 Will. 4) c 19) and finally the Justices of the Peace in Metropolis Act 1837 (7 Will. 4 & 1 Vict. c 37). The Marine Police were finally absorbed into the Metropolitan Police via the Metropolitan Police Act 1839.

References

Great Britain Acts of Parliament 1800
History of the Metropolitan Police
History of the River Thames
History of the London Borough of Tower Hamlets
History of the City of London
Port of London